The Bukit Tengah station  is a Malaysian railway station located at and named after the town of Bukit Tengah, Penang.

KTM ETS railway stations
Railway stations in Penang